Joshua Wilkinson may refer to:

Joshua Marie Wilkinson (born 1977), American poet, editor, publisher, and filmmaker
Joshua Wilkinson (footballer) (1897–1921), Scottish footballer